WVJP (1110 AM, Radio Caguas) is a radio station licensed to serve Caguas, Puerto Rico.  The station is owned by Borinquen Broadcasting Company. It airs a Talk/Personality format, and also simulcasts the Dimensión 103 network.

The station was assigned the WVJP call letters by the Federal Communications Commission in 1947.

References

External links

VJP
Radio stations established in 1948
Caguas, Puerto Rico
1948 establishments in Puerto Rico